Morales is a Spanish surname.

Morales may also refer to:

 Morales, Bolívar, located in the Bolívar Department of Colombia
 Morales, Cauca, located in the Cauca Department of Colombia
 Morales, Guatemala, a municipality in the Izabal department of Guatemala
 Morales District, district of the San Martin Province, Peru
 Morales Peak, mountain of Antarctica
 Morales-Sanchez, Texas, a census-designated place (CDP) in Zapata County, Texas, United States
 Morales (The Walking Dead), a fictional character from the television series The Walking Dead

See also
 Morales de Toro, municipality in Zamora, Castile and León, Spain